William Scammell (2 January 1939, in Southampton – 29 November 2000) was a British poet.

Life
He was born into a working-class family in the waterside village of Hythe on Southampton Water, but failed the eleven-plus exam.  His brother is Michael Scammell.

He enrolled as a mature student at Bristol University. He taught at the Workers' Educational Association.  He moved to the Lake District, with his artist wife, Jackie, and their two sons. In 1975, he moved to Cockermouth to teach at the Newcastle University.  In 1991, he taught at Nottingham Trent University.

His work appeared in Granta, and Lives of the Poets,

Awards
 1982 Cholmondeley Award

Work

Poetry
 
 
 
 
 
 Stare At The Moon,  Bleeding Heart Yard. 1992
 
 
 
 All Set To Fall Off The Edge Of The World Flambard Press 1998

Editor
   American edition Picador USA, 1995

Essays

References

External links
 

1939 births
2000 deaths
Writers from Southampton
Alumni of the University of Bristol
Academics of Nottingham Trent University
Academics of Newcastle University
20th-century British poets
British male poets
20th-century British male writers